Christophe Zugna (born 12 August 1972) is a retired French football defender.

References

1976 births
Living people
French footballers
Nîmes Olympique players
Association football defenders
Ligue 2 players